is a coach and former Japanese rugby union player. He was named in Japan's squad for the 2015 Rugby World Cup. He has been the MIE Honda HEAT’ FW coach since 2021.

Playing career 
2003-2009  Ricoh Black Rams

2004 International Rugby Academy of New Zealand

2005 Grammar Carlton Rugby Football Club (Auckland, New Zealand)

2009-2018  Kobelco Steelers

2012-2015 National team of Japan (・Japan v Wales 2013  ・Rugby World Cup 2015)

Coaching career 
2018-2020  Kyoto Sangyo University (as FW coach)

2020-2021  Kyoto Sangyo University (as Head coach)

2021-          MIE Honda HEAT (as FW coach)

References

1980 births
Living people
Japanese rugby union players
Japan international rugby union players
Sportspeople from Kobe
Rugby union locks
Kobelco Kobe Steelers players
Black Rams Tokyo players